"Steal My Kisses" is a song by American music group Ben Harper and the Innocent Criminals, released as a single from their album Burn to Shine in 2000 through Virgin Records America. The beat of the song is formed with beatboxing by Rahzel.

"Steal My Kisses" was released in April 2000 and peaked number 11 on the US Billboard Bubbling Under Hot 100. It also charted in New Zealand, where it held the number-two position on the RIANZ Singles Chart for four nonconsecutive weeks, finished 2000 as the country's fifth-best-selling single, and received a gold certification for sales of over 5,000. The music video was directed by Harper's producer/manager Jean-Pierre Plunier, and features Harper driving to a beach where he and his bandmates hang out with a group of bikini-clad women.

Track listing
 "Steal My Kisses"
 "Number Three" (live version)
 "By My Side" (live version)
 "Steal My Kisses" (Neptunes beatbox mix)

Charts

Weekly charts

Year-end charts

Certifications

Release history

References

Ben Harper songs
2000 songs
2000 singles
Songs written by Ben Harper
Virgin Records singles